Tianbao (Mandarin: 天宝乡) is a township in Anyue County, Ziyang, Sichuan, China. In 2010, Tianbao Township had a total population of 10,483: 5,430 males and 5,053 females: 2,188 aged under 14, 6,874 aged between 15 and 65 and 1,491 aged over 65.

References 
 

 

 
Township-level divisions of Sichuan
Anyue County